The 1999–2000 season was US Créteil-Lusitanos's 64th season in existence and the club's first season back in the second division of French football since 1993. In addition to the domestic league, Créteil participated in this season's editions of the Coupe de France and the Coupe de la Ligue. The season covered the period from 1 July 1999 to 30 June 2000.

Pre-season and friendlies

Competitions

Overview

French Division 1

League table

Results summary

Results by round

Matches 

Source:

Coupe de France

Coupe de la Ligue

References 

US Créteil-Lusitanos seasons
US Créteil-Lusitanos